Faithless are an English band that formed in 1995, with its core members being Rollo, Sister Bliss and Maxi Jazz. Their first album, Reverence, was released in 1996 and their most recent, All Blessed, in 2020. They have sold millions of physical records, and their catalogue was uploaded to streaming sites in 2018. They average almost 3 million streams a month. Faithless' records have charted at #1 in numerous countries and they were voted the 4th greatest dance band of all time by Mixmag.

Their musical style is often political. All Blessed uses award-winning photo-journalist Yannis Behrakis' picture of refugees on the front, focusing on immigration as its core theme.

Faithless have headlined numerous major festivals in Europe and beyond, including Glastonbury. Their lyrics have been quoted in both the US Senate and the Houses of Parliament.

Musical career
Faithless' first album Reverence was conceived as a mixtape which covers many genres, encapsulating house, hip-hop, folk and classical music. The album was released on Rollo's label, Cheeky Records.

Their first show at Camden’s Jazz cafe to showcase Reverence was a sell-out, and a global tour ensued as the record went up the charts all over Europe. The singles "Insomnia" and "Salva Mea" each selling over a million copies, and album going either platinum or gold in every European territory.

The second studio album, Mercury-nominated Sunday 8PM, contained the global hit "God Is a DJ" and established Faithless as a major touring force in 1998. Emotive videos were directed by featured vocalist Jamie Catto, featuring the band’s transcendent live shows, and helped bring Faithless’ live prowess to the attention of music fans. They were nominated for Best British Dance Act at the Brit Awards in 1999.

In 2001, their third album Outrospective was the first to be released on major label Sony BMG and captured the dreamy synergy between sadness and mad delirium giving rise to hit singles "We Come 1" and a tribute to Muhammad Ali. In 2002, they performed on the Pyramid stage at Glastonbury, with another nomination for best British Dance Act at The Brit Awards in the same year. They won Best Dance and Best Live Act at the TMF Awards in the Netherlands in 2001.

In 2004, their fourth album No Roots debuted at number 1 in the UK, conceived as a conceptual continuous piece of music in one key, with strong lyrical gravitas it featured vocals from Dido, new collaborator L.S.K, and the late Nina Simone. Dave Grohl of Nirvana and Foo Fighters cited Faithless’ hit protest song "Mass Destruction" as the song he most wished he had written during an interview with Q magazine, and the lyrics were quoted in the US Senate. A powerful video directed by award-winning directing team Dom & Nick alluded to abuses of power during the Iraq War to chilling effect, tracing the connection from childhood bullying to terrorism and genocide.

Encouraged by their label, Faithless released a Greatest Hits album, Forever Faithless. The Greatest Hits album went four times platinum and was the best-selling dance album of 2005. A huge global tour followed the success of the album. Their fifth album, To All New Arrivals, inspired by the birth of Sister Bliss’ son, and Rollo’s young family born into uncertain futures was released in 2006, exploring themes of global poverty, immigration, conflict and belonging, through the concept of "new arrivals". The first single "Bombs", with its anti-war message and video directed by award-winning director Howard Greenhalgh, was not playlisted on daytime MTV or BBC Radio 1. The album also featured collaborations with Cat Power and Robert Smith of The Cure, and the band headlined Coachella Valley Festival in 2007.

Their sixth album The Dance was released on 16 May 2010, after a four-year recording break for the band, on their own label "Nate’s Tunes" - and was 2nd in the UK album charts behind The Rolling Stones. Faithless again graced the Pyramid stage at Glastonbury in 2010, celebrating sold-out arena and stadium tours across Europe. In that year alone, they played to over one million people and sold over 400,000 records. Faithless performed at Brixton Academy on 7 and 8 April 2011 and was transmitted live via satellite to cinemas across Europe.

In 2015, Faithless released a remix album under the banner of Faithless 2.0. The studio album featured contributions from the biggest names in electronic music including Avicii, Tiësto, Armin van Buuren, Claptone and Booka Shade. The album contained tracks from their 25-year career, encompassing seventeen top 40 singles, six Top 10 albums and they embarked on a tour to celebrate the album released. In 2015 and 2016, the band played a series of live dates under the Faithless 2.0 banner, featuring Maxi Jazz and a full live band. Jazz left the group for the final time in 2016.

After a seven-year recording hiatus, the seventh Faithless studio album All Blessed was released in August 2020. The release came in the middle of the Covid-19 pandemic, with the themes of the album weaving around immigration, identity, empathy and lack of it. The first track that was officially released from the album came on the same weekend as the album release, Synthesizer, a love letter to electronic music. The album features vocals from newcomers Nathan Ball and spoken word artist & poet Suli Breaks, along with Caleb Femi. Other notable appearances on the album include Soul II Soul founder Jazzie B, Gaika, and Damien Jurado. Rollo said of the album, "We want to give them something else – something that could breathe." It continued their top 3 chart success in the UK and Europe.

On 23 December 2022, Maxi Jazz died "peacefully in his sleep" at his home in London, England at the age of 65. Seven days later, the band's compilation Forever Faithless entered the UK Album Downloads chart at number 7.

Other work
In between album releases Faithless also released highly respected compilation albums revealing more of their personality and influence including the long running Back to Mine sessions as well as NME in Association with War Child Presents 1 Love, The Bedroom Sessions and the Renaissance 3D music project, in conjunction with the iconic Renaissance nightclub.

As well as their own studio albums, all three members have actively engaged in other people's work as solo artists. Sister Bliss is a prominent dance DJ and has for a long time toured the circuit on her own, and has also scored numerous TV, film and theatre productions, along with presenting an award-winning Bauer Media show on Scala Radio joining the dots between classical and electronic music. Sister Bliss’ hugely successful weekly radio show and podcast ‘Sister Bliss in Session’, is syndicated to over 100 stations & 43 countries worldwide, and has around 10 million listeners per month and 60,000 podcast downloads per month. Rollo and Sister Bliss released a new collaborative record with Dido in 2019 under the moniker ‘R PLUS’ - ‘The Last Summer’, and second R PLUS album WeDisappear followed in 2022. Maxi Jazz also collaborated with Faithless founding member Jamie Catto on his  project 1 Giant Leap and released an album with his band Maxi Jazz and the E-Type Boys. Finally, Rollo founded the label Cheeky Records and has produced the music of other artists, most notably his sister Dido's albums, as well as using various monikers to create popular dance music under the names Rollo Goes... (Camping, Mystic and Spiritual), Felix, Our Tribe (with Rob Dougan), and Dusted.

Band members

Current members
 Sister Bliss – keyboards, synthesizers, piano, production, arrangement, mixer, composer, programmer (1995–2011; 2015–present)
 Rollo – keyboards, drum machine, guitar, bass, production, arrangement, mixer, composer, programmer (1995–2011; 2015–present)

Former members
 Maxi Jazz – lead vocals, guitar, programmer, production (1995–2011; 2015–2016, died 2022)
 Jamie Catto – lead and backing vocals, guitar (1995–1999)

Discography

Reverence (1996)
Sunday 8PM (1998)
Outrospective (2001)
No Roots (2004)
Everything Will Be Alright Tomorrow (2004)
Forever Faithless (2005)
To All New Arrivals (2006)
The Dance (2010)
Faithless 2.0 (2015)
All Blessed (2020)

See also
List of Billboard number-one dance hits
List of artists who reached number one on the U.S. dance chart

References

External links
Official web site (UK)

 
 
  The story of Faithless in the french PDF magazine Soundamental

Musical groups established in 1995
Musical groups disestablished in 2011
Musical groups reestablished in 2015
1995 establishments in England
2011 disestablishments in England
English dance music groups
Arista Records artists
Sony Music UK artists
English electronic music groups
English house music groups
British techno music groups
Trip hop groups
British trance music groups
Remixers
Musical groups from London
BT Digital Music Awards winners